Sleepwalkers is the second studio album by Brian Fallon, singer/guitarist of American rock band The Gaslight Anthem, released on February 9, 2018, through Island Records. The album peaked at #42 on the Billboard 200 chart and received "generally favorable reviews" from critics.

Background
"Sleepwalkers" is notably closer to the rocknroll sound of The Gaslight Anthem than his previous folk influenced solo album "Painkillers." In an interview with RollingStone, Fallon said “even though it’s not necessarily [a Gaslight Anthem album], one-fourth of the band’s sound is always whatever I brought to the table. That’s mine, in anything that I do. It’d be like saying, ‘OK, I’m not going to use my left arm,'” says Fallon. “I’m just going to embrace everything I do and not hold anything back, because I like this sound.”  The album also has a noticeable R&B influence on tracks such as "If Your Prayers Don't Get To Heaven" and "Etta James."

Reception
Sleepwalkers received generally positive reviews from music critics. At Metacritic, which assigns a normalised rating out of 100 to reviews from mainstream publications, the album received an average score of 69, based on 11 professional reviews, indicating "generally favorable reviews". In a positive review Paste Magazine observed that "Fallon has a knack for crafting sturdy tunes that border on anthemic, and every chorus has fist-pumping potential."

Track listing

Personnel
Credits adapted from the physical album liner notes.

Musicians
 Brian Fallon – Guitar, keyboards, piano, vocals, backing vocals
 Ian Perkins – Guitar
 Nick Sailsbury – Bass
 Dave Hidalgo – Drums
 Steve Sidelnyk – additional drum/percussion programming
 Preservation Hall Jazz Band – appear on the song "Sleepwalkers"
Clint Maedgen – saxophone
Kyle Roussel – piano
Branden Lewis – trumpet

Technical personnel
 Ted Hutt – recording, production
 Ryan Mall – engineering
 Nick Guttmann and Gene O'Neill – recording assistance at The Parlor Recording Studio
 Ted Hutt and Ryan Mall – mixing at Kingsize Soundlabs, Eagle Rock, California
 Greg Calbi – mastering
 Joe Spix – art direction
 Ashley Pawlak and Joe Spix – design
 Matt Burnette-Lemon – package production
 Drew Gurian – photography

Charts

Release history

References

2018 albums
Brian Fallon albums
Albums produced by Ted Hutt
Island Records albums